Merowe may refer to:

 Meroe or Meroë, a town in the Sudan, site of over 200 pyramids
 Merowe, Sudan, site of the Merowe Dam
 Merawi (woreda), Amhara Region of Ethiopia
 Merwede or Merwe or Merowe, several interconnected stretches of river in the Netherlands